Nathaniel Atcheson (1772-1825) was an English ship-owner who was appointed secretary to a Committee of London shipowners and the Society of Ship-Owners of Great Britain with whom the London Committee was associated.

Atcheson formed the London Pitt Club in 1793 with a view to counteract the radical ideas of the French Revolution.

Ship building research
In 1806 he started conducted research on ship-builders in London with the help of Charles Jenkinson. He wrote to a number of ship builders to  enquire how many ships they had built since December 1802.

Writing
In 1803, he authored the Report of the Case Fisher against Ward respecting the Russian Embargo on British Ships. The blockade was initiated by Paul I of Russia and Fisher was a crew member of the Fishburn.

References

1772 births
1825 deaths
18th-century English people
19th-century English people